Fulham United FC (founded in 1970) is a football club based in Fulham, South Australia. Fulham United are in the South Australian State League 1 competition, after gaining promotion from the South Australian State League 2 competition in 2017. Their senior women's team plays in the elite FFSA Women's National Premier League. In October 2019 Jenna McCormick, who played in Fulham's NPL team was selected for the Australian national women's team to play in two friendly international matches against Chile. Fulham United boasts some 400 junior players including both boys and girls, making it by far the biggest footballing breeding ground in the Western suburbs of SA.

Men's History – FFSA Era

2015
Fulham were granted entry into the men's FFSA NPL competitions in 2015, finally separating from the South Australian Amateur Soccer League (SAASL) and joining the FFSA State League 2 in 2016.

2016
In their debut season in the FFSA, the club finished in fifth place.

2017
Fulham retained many of their first team squad, whilst adding to it with the signings of Joseph Puntieri, Marco Mittaga, Daniel Aurnoutse, Mark Talladira and Thomas Dicheira. The team ended up in a promotion play-off against Port Pirie, which Fulham won. The lost the Grand Final to Seaford Rangers 2–1 at Cooper's Stadium, however the ultimate goal of promotion was achieved. The club came to an agreement with the FFSA to use The Shores Football Centre, West Beach as their home ground for the upcoming 2018 State League 1 season.

Players

First team squad

References

Soccer clubs in Adelaide
Association football clubs established in 1970
1970 establishments in Australia